Shangcai County is a county in the south of Henan province, China. It is under the administration of the prefecture-level city of Zhumadian.

Administrative divisions
As 2017, this county is divided to 4 subdistricts, 12 towns and 10 townships.
Subdistricts

Towns

Townships

Climate

See also
 Cai (state), an ancient state in that area

References

County-level divisions of Henan
Zhumadian